St Elisabeth's Church is a church in the Old Town area of Eastbourne, England. It was built in 1938 to the designs of local architects Stonham & Sons and Fenning.  The church hall is a good example of the architecture of the period. St E's, as it is affectionately referred to, is an Anglican church within the Diocese of Chichester.

The original derelict church building, which is set for demolition in 2019 and 2020, once contained chancel paintings by the art historian and conservator, Ernest William Tristram (1882-1952).  Now housed in the new domed church building next door, the Tristram Panels depict the life of John the Baptist and his parents, the priest Zacharias and his wife Elizabeth. (Tristram also painted a limited number of original works, including the panels at St Elisabeth's and paintings at York Minster and St Fin Barre's Cathedral in Cork City). In addition, St Elisabeth's crypt contained a series of large wall paintings by the artist Hans Feibusch (1898-1998). Through this work he came to the attention of Charles Herbert Reilly, professor of architecture, and George Bell who provided Feinbusch with the opportunity to create a mural of his own design at St Elisabeth's in 1944.  Feibusch chose the allegory of Pilgrim's Progress as a vehicle for his own story as a refugee fleeing Nazi Germany and his eventual acceptance in 1940s Britain. Feibusch enlisted the help of local people to complete the mural, which is now a registered War Memorial dedicated to civilian casualties of war.

Gallery

See also
List of places of worship in Eastbourne
Listed buildings in Eastbourne

References

External links
 
 Summary of the church at Sussex Parish Churches website

1935 establishments in England
Churches completed in 1938
Church of England church buildings in East Sussex
Grade II listed churches in East Sussex
Churches in Eastbourne